This is a list of English football transfers for the 2007 Summer transfer window. Only moves featuring at least one Premiership or Championship club are listed.

The summer transfer window opened on 1 July 2007, although a few transfers took place prior to that date; the first prominent move went through on 17 April. The window closed on 31 August. Players without a club may join one, either during or in between transfer windows. Clubs below Premiership level may also sign players on loan at any time. If need be, clubs may sign a goalkeeper on an emergency loan, if all others are unavailable.

Transfers

See also
List of English football transfers Winter 2007-08

Notes and references

 
 
 
 
 

English
Transfers Summer 2011
Summer 2007